"The Irish Rover" is an Irish folk song about a magnificent though improbable sailing ship that reaches an unfortunate end. It has been recorded by numerous artists, some of whom have made changes to the lyrics over time.

The song describes a gigantic ship with "twenty-three masts" (versions by The Dubliners and The Pogues claim twenty-seven), a colourful crew and varied types of cargo in enormous amounts. The verses grow successively more extravagant about the wonders of the great ship. The seven-year voyage culminates in a disastrous end, after the ship suffers a measles outbreak, killing all but the narrator and the captain's dog. The ship then strikes a rock, turning "nine times around" and sinking. The captain's dog drowns in the incident, and the narrator is the only survivor, "the last of the Irish Rover," leaving no one else alive to contradict the tale.

History
According to the 1966 publication Walton's New Treasury of Irish Songs and Ballads 2, the song is attributed to songwriter/arranger J. M. Crofts.

There is a manuscript version of the song dated to 1937/38. It is currently in the Irish National Folklore Collection in Dublin. The source is Lisgotman Townland, Cloonlogher, County Leitrim. The next source for Roud 7379 in the Vaughan Williams Library catalogue is the singer Denis Murray from County Cork, collected by Fred Hamer, possibly 1946. On the time scale of traditional folk songs this is quite recent.

However a Canadian source, Oliver John Abbott (1872 - 1962) was born in England and worked in farms in an Irish community in the Ottawa Valley. He recorded this song in 1961 but claimed to have learned it the 1880s and 1890s. Another source in Maine was recorded in 1941. This suggests that the song is connected to an Irish expatriate community in Canada or the USA.

Charts
(The Pogues & The Dubliners single)

Cultural impact 

 "The Irish Rover" is a popular Irish-Gaelic Scottish country dance and is set to the music of the song.
 The Irish Rovers, created in 1963, were named after the traditional song "The Irish Rover" by their mother in Ballymena, N. Ireland.
 A character from the song lends his name to the political blog Slugger O'Toole.

Recordings
"The Irish Rover" has been recorded many times including:
 1966 – The Irish Rovers on their debut album, The First of the Irish Rovers.  They recorded it again in 1996 for the album, The Irish Rovers' Gems.
 1987 – The Dubliners with The Pogues on The Dubliners's album 25 Years Celebration. When released as a single in the same year this version reached number 8 in the UK Singles Chart, number 1 in the Irish Singles Chart and number 45 in the Euro Chart.

References

1987 singles
Irish folk songs
Irish Singles Chart number-one singles
The Dubliners songs
The Pogues songs
Fictional ships